New Jersey Transit operates interstate bus routes in northern New Jersey, most terminating at the Port Authority Bus Terminal (PABT) in Midtown Manhattan. There are several routes to the George Washington Bridge Bus Terminal and one serves Lower Manhattan via the Holland Tunnel. Some of the routes that use the Lincoln Tunnel to the PABT make stops on 30th and 31st Streets in Union City to allow for local connections in Hudson County, others remain on Route 495 and do not stop.

Below, the routes are listed by, region, and number.

Northern Division
Northern Division routes go to points in Bergen, Hudson, and Passaic counties in New Jersey, along with Orange County in New York.

From the George Washington Bridge Bus Terminal and GWB Plaza

To Hudson County

To Hudson and Bergen from PABT

To Passaic County and Orange County, New York from PABT

Central Division
Central Division routes go to points south of the Essex/Passaic county line, and west of the Passaic River.

Serving Newark and Irvington
These routes are assigned to Hilton Bus Garage in Maplewood and operate to and from the Port Authority Bus Terminal. These are exact fare routes.

To the Raritan Valley
These routes are assigned to the Ironbound Garage in Newark and run to and from the Port Authority Bus Terminal.

To points south of the Raritan River
These routes are assigned to the Howell Garage in Howell Twp. with some rush hour service on some lines operated by Academy Bus, and run to and from the Port Authority Bus Terminal.  All routes operate during weekday peak hours only, except for the 137 and 139.

Former routes
This list includes routes that have been renumbered or are now operated by private companies.

References

External links
New Jersey Transit - Bus
Unofficial New Jersey bus map

 100
Transportation in Hudson County, New Jersey
Transportation in Essex County, New Jersey
Transportation in Union County, New Jersey
Transportation in Middlesex County, New Jersey
Transportation in Monmouth County, New Jersey
Lists of New Jersey bus routes